Itaituba Airport  is the airport serving Itaituba, Brazil.

History
Itaituba is one of the most important airports in the southwest region of the state of Pará, being classified as a regional airport. It is served by regular flights. In addition, air taxi companies offer flights to small villages and localities farther away from the city urban area, as well as to several gold mining spots and neighboring cities.

Airlines and destinations

Accidents and incidents
 26 April 1994: a Penta Cessna 208A Caravan registration PP-OGI flying from Itaituba to Jacareacanga under poor visibility and below minimums crashed shortly before touch-down at Jacareacanga partly due to the pilot's lack of experience. The crew of 2 died.
 22 October 1994: a TABA DHC-8-300 was hijacked by thieves, who stole a load of gold that had as destination the city of Belém, Pará.

Access

See also

List of airports in Brazil

References

External links

Airports in Pará